Pilekiidae is a family of trilobites in the order Phacopida, specifically within Suborder Cheirurina. It includes the following genera:

Anacheiruraspis
Anacheirurus
Chashania
Demeterops
Emsurina
Koraipsis
Landyia
Macrogrammus
Metapilekia
Metapliomerops
Parapilekia
Pilekia
Pliomeroides
Pseudopliomera
Seisonia
Sinoparapilekia
Victorispina

References

 
Trilobite families